A murder conviction without a body is an instance of a person being convicted of murder despite the absence of the victim's body. Circumstantial and forensic evidence are prominent in such convictions. Hundreds of such convictions have occurred in the past, some of which have been overturned. In all cases, unless otherwise noted, the remains of the victims were never recovered.

Australia

Belgium

Brazil

Canada

France

Germany

Iceland

India

Italy

Jamaica

Malaysia

New Zealand

Philippines

Portugal

Romania

Singapore

Spain

United Kingdom

United States

See also

Lists of people who disappeared
List of unsolved deaths

References

Murder convictions without a body
~